El Pepe: A Supreme Life is a 2018 documentary film directed by the award-winning Serbian filmmaker Emir Kusturica and starring Uruguay's former president (and former guerrilla fighter) José Mujica. The premise revolves around José "Pepe" Mujica's life and legacy of Uruguay's philosopher-president.

Cast
 José Mujica
 Lucía Topolansky
 Eleuterio Fernández Huidobro
 Mauricio Rosencof
 Emir Kusturica

Release
The documentary debuted, out of competition, at the Venice Film Festival 2018. and became available for streaming on Netflix on December 27, 2019.

Reception
The film has received  praise and criticism alike.

On Rotten Tomatoes it has  rating based on reviews from  critics.

Former Tupamaro guerrilla fighter Jorge Zabalza, whose brother died at the Taking of Pando in 1969, has become a vocal critic of the film.

References

External links
 
 

2018 films
Documentary films about Uruguay
2010s Spanish-language films
Films directed by Emir Kusturica
Netflix original documentary films
Cultural depictions of Emir Kusturica